The fleur-de-lis is the main element in the logo of most Scouting organizations, representing a major theme in Scouting: the outdoors and wilderness. The crest is white on a purple background. The white represents purity and the purple represents leadership and help given to others.

Background
The three petals or leaves represent the threefold Scout Promise (Duty to God and Country, Duty to Self, Duty to Others) in much the same way as the three leaves of the trefoil represent the threefold promise for the Guides.  Lord Robert Baden-Powell, the founder of the Scouting movement, explained that the Scouts adopted the fleur-de-lis symbol from its use in the compass rose because it "points in the right direction (and upwards) turning neither to the right nor left, since these lead backward again." The two small five-point stars stand for truth and knowledge. Together their ten points represent the ten original Scout laws. The reef knot or square knot represents the strength of World Scouting. The rope is for the unity of Scouts throughout the world. The ring holding the petals together represents the bond of brotherhood.

External links

References

Scouting uniform